The Rumskulla oak, also known as the Kvill oak, is an oak tree (Quercus robur) near Norra Kvill National Park in Rumskulla socken, Vimmerby, Kalmar County, Småland, Sweden. It is the oldest oak in Sweden and one of the largest trees in Scandinavia, and was first described in 1772.

History 
The tree is more than 1,000 years old and was first described by Magnus Gabriel Craelius in 1772 in Försök till ett landskaps beskrivning ("Essay in the description of a landscape"). According to Eksjö Municipality, it is the oldest tree in Scandinavia and the largest in circumference.

There was an iron band around the trunk to support it, thought to have been put there in the 19th century. It was partially replaced after being cut in 2005 by someone who said he wanted to "free" the tree. In 2013, new interventions, such as wire supports, were installed. A chain a little higher up prevents the trunk from splitting; the tree is now completely hollow.

The hollow trunk of the tree was the location for sex scenes in I Am Curious (Yellow), a 1967 film by Vilgot Sjöman. The film was controversial when first released, including being banned in Massachusetts; in a case that went all the way to the Supreme Court of the United States, it was ultimately determined not to be obscene.

Nature reserve 
The Rumskulla oak is registered as a national natural object of interest with the Swedish National Heritage Board and in 2008, the Kvill Nature Reserve was created around it as the first nature reserve in the municipality. The  preserve was created to preserve a traditionally open landscape with large oaks and other deciduous trees which contrasts with the nearby pine woods. It is adjacent to Norra Kvill National Park. The tree is accessible for disabled people.

Close-up views of trunk

See also 
Angel Oak
Major Oak
Liernu Oak
Royal Oak
List of superlative trees in Sweden
Tree That Owns Itself

References

External links 

 Per Eliasson. "Rumskullaeken: Sveriges äldsta träd". Nationalencyklopedin 2002 
 Kvill Oak. Vimmerby tourist office
 Photo (June 2014)
 International Oak Society.org – look for "The Mighty Oak of Kvill"

Geography of Kalmar County
Individual oak trees
Individual trees in Sweden